In/Out/In is a 2022 compilation album by Sonic Youth, released on Three Lobed Recordings. It contains five previously unreleased songs recorded between 2000 and 2010.

Track listing
"Basement Contender" – 9:34
"In & Out" – 7:35
"Machine" – 3:37
"Social Static" – 11:41
"Out & In" – 12:18

Charts

References 

2022 compilation albums
Sonic Youth compilation albums